Ternovoye is a rural locality (a selo) in Gubaryovskoye Rural Settlement, Semiluksky District, Voronezh Oblast, Russia. The population was 113 as of 2010. There are 29 streets.

Geography 
Ternovoye is located on the right bank of the Veduga, 8 km north of Semiluki (the district's administrative centre) by road. Gudovka is the nearest rural locality.

References 

Rural localities in Semiluksky District